Jaber Ansari (born 10 January 1987) is an Iranian professional footballer who plays for Aluminium Arak in the Persian Gulf Pro League.

Club career
Ansari joined Saba Qom in 2009 after spending the previous season at Shahrdari Tabriz.

On 24 June 2015, Ansari signed a two-year contract with Esteghlal.

Club statistics

1 Statistics Incomplete.

 Assist Goals

Honours
Esteghlal
Hazfi Cup (1) : 2017–18

References

 جابر انصاری، محمد ایران پوریان و مرتضی آقاخان به آلومینیوم پیوستند Retaved in Persian www.isna.ir خبرگزاری ایسنا 
 انصاری: مقابل پرسپولیس اشتباه کردیم و تنبیه شدیم Retaved in Persian www.tasnimnews.com خبرگزاری تسنیم 
خوش و بش جابر انصاری با بازیکنان استقلال Retaved in Persian www.ilna.news خبرگزاری ایلنا 
دو سال به احترام استقلال شکایت نکردم/ منتظر تماس باشگاه هستم Retaved in Persian www.mehrnews.com خبرگزاری مهر  
Jaber Ansari biography Retaved in Persian بیوگرافی جابر انصاری   
جابر انصاری قراردادش را با استقلال ثبت کرد/ کادرفنی آبی‌ها سه‌شنبه در هیات فوتبال + عکس Retaved in Persian www.farsnews.com خبرگزاری فارس    
Esteghlal vs. Persepolis Retaved in Soccerway 30 October 2015

External links 

 Jaber Ansari at PersianLeague.com
 Jaber Ansari at Soccerway
 
 Jaber Ansari at FootballDatabase.eu
 Jaber Ansari on Instagram

1987 births
Living people
Iranian footballers
Sportspeople from Tabriz
Saba players
Shahrdari Tabriz players
Saipa F.C. players
Fajr Sepasi players
Gostaresh Foulad F.C. players
Esteghlal F.C. players
Persian Gulf Pro League players
Azadegan League players
Association football wingers